KUMC may refer to:

 KUMC-LP, a radio station
 University of Kansas Medical Center, a medical center in Kansas City, Kansas, United States